Courtney MacIntosh (born December 12, 1983 in Oshawa, Ontario) is a Canadian rower from St. John's, Newfoundland and Labrador.

At the 2006 Commonwealth Rowing Championships, she won two silver medals for Canada. She was a gold medalist at the 2009 USRowing National Championships. She studied kinesiology at the University of Texas at Austin and law at The University of Western Ontario.

References

1983 births
Canadian female rowers
Living people
Sportspeople from Oshawa